Nonviolent Self Defense (NSD) is a system of self-protection and humane control developed in the 1970s by Harvard-trained educational psychologist Dr. William Paul( (1939–1989). 

NSD was devised for use by mental health professionals who dealt with potentially violent psychiatric patients on a daily basis. NSD is a system of integrated self-defense and control skills based on whole-body movement and pliancy. The system features evasion, deflection, dodging, disengagement, and restraint. NSD does not allow any offensive movements (kicking, striking, etc.) other than the use of humane restraint. Nonviolent Self Defense is now used by mental health, social service, law enforcement, and education professionals throughout the United States for nonviolent crisis intervention.

References

 Paul, William Wayne (1980) Aggression, Control and Nonverbal Communication: Aspects of Asian Martial Arts (Doctoral Dissertation,   Harvard University, 1979)
 Smith, Robert W. (1999) Martial Musings: A Portrayal of Martial Arts in the 20th Century.  Via Media Publishing, 
 Howard, Kent F. (2016) Crisis Intervention Training with Nonviolent Self-defense, INRSeminars.com
 Howard, Kent F. (2016) Crisis Intervention Training with Nonviolent Self-defense (DVD), INRSeminars.com
 Howard, Kent F., nonviolentselfdefense.blogspot.com

See also
 Hard and soft (martial arts)
 William Wayne Paul

Self-defense